Sutton is a small hamlet in the Vale of Glamorgan, just south of Llandow.

History
Sutton was once home to the Turbervill family, and Edward Turbervill once had his seat at Sutton. A Bronze Age barrow has been unearthed in Sutton. In 1940, Sir Cyril Fox was said to have found "a primary burial of a typical Beaker man, crouched in a large pit cut into the subsoil, with a Beaker of debased 'B1' type and barbed and tanged flint arrow-heads."

Notable landmarks
It contains three listed buildings, Sutton Farmhouse which is Grade II* listed and the "Long Range of Outbuildings to Northwest of Sutton Farmhouse" and "Small Outbuilding immediately to West of Sutton Farmhouse" which are Grade II listed. Nearby is Llandow Industrial Estate and Springfield Nurseries, a major supplier of pot Chrysanthemums to the UK market.

A 5 bedroom mansion in Sutton named The Granary was valued at £730,000 as of August 2011, making it amongst the most expensive properties in the county.

References

Villages in the Vale of Glamorgan